Edward Merrill may refer to:

Edward C. Merrill Jr. (1920–1995), fourth President of Gallaudet University
Edward F. Merrill (1883–1962), Chief Justice of the Maine Supreme Judicial Court
Edward S. Merrill (c. 1880–1951), American track athlete and college football player and coach
Edward Wilson Merrill (born 1923), American biomaterials scientist
Ed Merrill (1860–1946), Major League Baseball second baseman